Odd Andersen (30 May 1920 – 24 September 2007) was a Norwegian footballer. He played in one match for the Norway national football team in 1949.

References

External links
 
 

1920 births
2007 deaths
Norwegian footballers
Norway international footballers
Association football midfielders
Fredrikstad FK players